Kearsley Community School District is a public school district in Genesee County, residing in the U.S. state of Michigan and is part of the Genesee Intermediate School District.

History 
Kearsley Community Schools is named after U.S. Army Major Jonathan Kearsley, who fought in the War of 1812.
The first Kearsley school opened before the Civil War, the land being donated by Mr. and Mrs. John and Mary Cashin, the single room building was burnt down later in 1929. The same year the district got a $ 42500 bond to purchase land and build an eight-room school. In 1937 the first superintendent, George Daly, was hired. Sometime in 1940 four different school districts, Tanner, White, Wentworth,  and Kearsley, combined to form the Kearsley Rural Agricultural School District.

Schools
Located east of Flint, Michigan, the Kearsley School District is home to nearly 3000 PK12 students.  Schools operated by the Kearsley Board of Education include:
 Pumpkin Patch Early Childhood Center (Buffey Elementary)
 Weston Elementary
 Dowdall Elementary
 Fiedler Elementary
 Armstrong Middle School
 Kearsley High School

Former Kearsley schools
Tanner Elementary 
Paro Elementary
Burgtorf Elementary School
George Daly Jr High; formerly Kearsley High
Wentworth Elementary

Notable alumni
 Mark Farner of Grand Funk Railroad

References
https://kearsleyeclipse.com/12975/news/kearsley-celebrates-its-75th-anniversary/

https://nces.ed.gov/ccd/districtsearch/district_detail.asp?ID2=2620070

External links
 Kearsley Community Schools Website

School districts in Michigan
Education in Genesee County, Michigan